Anthiyur taluk() is a taluk of Erode district of the Indian state of Tamil Nadu. Anthiyur became separate taluk in Erode district by restructuring Bhavani and Gobichettipalayam on 22 November 2012. It comprises four blocks – Anthiyur, Athani, Burgur and Ammapet It comes under Gobichettipalayam Revenue Division.

Demographics
The taluk of Anthiyur had a population of ~225,900.

References

External links
 https://web.archive.org/web/20180330160655/http://www.erode.tn.nic.in/taluk.htm

Taluks of Erode district